Odebrecht is a Brazilian company.

Odebrecht may also refer to:

 Odebrecht Foundation
 Norberto Odebrecht Construtora
 Odebrecht (surname)